The 2007 North Carolina Tar Heels baseball team represented the University of North Carolina at Chapel Hill in the 2007 NCAA Division I baseball season. They play their home games at Bryson Field at Boshamer Stadium and are members of the Atlantic Coast Conference.

The Tar Heels won the  ACC tournament title.  They made the 2007 NCAA Division I baseball tournament as the third-overall seed, and advanced to the 2007 College World Series, finishing as the national runner-up.

Roster

See also 
 North Carolina Tar Heels
 2007 NCAA Division I baseball season

References 

North Carolina Tar Heels
North Carolina Tar Heels baseball seasons
North Carolina
North
College World Series seasons
Atlantic Coast Conference baseball champion seasons